"Chicks Dig It" is a song co-written and recorded by American country music singer Chris Cagle. It was released in June 2003 as the second single from his self-titled album.  It peaked at #5 on the U.S. country charts and at #53 on the Billboard Hot 100. It was written by Cagle and Charlie Crowe.

Content
A moderate up-tempo with country rock influences, "Chicks Dig It" tell of the narrator, who has always done various stunts — often injuring himself in the process — in attempts to impress females, because the "chicks dig it".

Music video
The music video features Cagle and his band performing at a local skate park. The music video was directed by Peter Zavadil.

Chart performance
The song debuted at number 57 on the Hot Country Singles & Tracks chart dated June 28, 2003. Having charted for 30 weeks on that chart, it peaked at number 5 on the chart dated December 20, 2003. It also peaked at number 53 on the Billboard Hot 100.

Charts

Year-end charts

Parodies
 American parody artist Cledus T. Judd released a parody of "Chicks Dig It" titled "The Chicks Did It" on his 2003 album The Original Dixie Hick.

References

External links

2003 singles
2003 songs
Chris Cagle songs
Music videos directed by Peter Zavadil
Songs written by Chris Cagle
Capitol Records Nashville singles